The Russian Premier League Cup was a football competition organized by Russian Premier League. This was a knockout competition for 16 teams of the Premier League. All ties, including the final, were two-legged. The winners of the Cup did not get any special bonuses (such as the participation the UEFA Cup), and the matches were played on the days reserved for national team fixtures. These two factors prevented most clubs from fielding their strongest teams, and matches were played by mixed or reserve teams. Consequently, the competition did not gain much popularity, and the first edition of 2003 became the last. FC Zenit Saint Petersburg won the only tournament, beating FC Chernomorets Novorossiysk in the final 5–2 on aggregate.

Final

External links
  Russia - Cup Finals, RSSSF.com

Cup
League Cup
National association football league cups
Defunct football competitions in Russia
2003 in Russian football